Riikka Ketoja (born 10 September 1994) is a Finnish footballer who plays as a midfielder. She has been a member of the Finland women's national team.

References

1994 births
Living people
Finnish women's footballers
Women's association football midfielders
FC United (Jakobstad) players
Kokkola Futis 10 players
Sunnanå SK players
Turun Palloseura (women's football) players
Kansallinen Liiga players
Finland women's international footballers
Finnish expatriate footballers
Finnish expatriate sportspeople in Sweden
Expatriate women's footballers in Sweden